Broughton is a civil parish in the City of Preston, Lancashire, England.  It contains 15 listed buildings that are recorded in the National Heritage List for England.  Of these, one is at Grade II*, the middle grade, and the others are at Grade II, the lowest grade.  The parish contains the village of Broughton, and surrounding countryside.  The listed buildings consist of three houses, a cottage that has been converted into a museum, two churches, one of which has associated listed structures, two schools, a pinfold, two war memorials, and a milestone.

Key

Buildings

References

Citations

Sources

Lists of listed buildings in Lancashire
Buildings and structures in the City of Preston